Diallo Guidileye (born 30 December 1989) is a Mauritanian footballer, who currently plays as a defensive midfielder for Fath Union Sport, a club based in Rabat.

Club career
Guidileye began his career playing for AS Poissy, in the western suburbs of Paris, before moving to Troyes AC on a youth contract. After impressing during training sessions, he was called up to the first team and made his professional debut, at the age of 17, on 30 November 2007, in a Ligue 2 match against Boulogne-sur-Mer. He started the match playing the full 90 minutes, picking up a yellow card in the process. Guidileye went on to become a staple of the starting eleven, appearing in every following match that season. Midway through the season, Guidileye agreed to his first professional contract signing three-year contract with the club.

His surprising success at Troyes have attracted several Ligue 1 clubs to scout him. OGC Nice, Paris Saint-Germain, Bordeaux, and Saint-Étienne have all declared their interest in the young midfielder. On 9 October 2009, Guidileye scored his first career league goal in a 4–0 victory over Évian.

In January 2011, Guidileye joined Stade Brestois 29, but remained on loan at Troyes until the end of the season. His 2011–2012 season with Brest was limited due to injuries: he could only participate to 6 games. In January 2013, he was loaned out to Ligue 2 club LB Chateauroux, for whom he played 10 league games. For the 2013–2014 season, he returned to Brest, who had been relegated to Ligue 2 in the meantime.

On the last day of the 2019 January transfer window, Guidileye was one of 22 players on two hours, that signed for Turkish club Elazığspor. They had been placed under a transfer embargo but managed to negotiate it with the Turkish FA, leading to them going on a mad spree of signing and registering a load of players despite not even having a permanent manager in place. In just two hours, they managed to snap up a record 22 players - 12 coming in on permanent contracts and a further 10 joining on loan deals until the end of the season.

In July 2019, Diallo joined Fath Union Sport.

International career
Though Guidileye was born in Mauritania, he has dual citizenship and thus can represent France on the national level. He has played for the France U-19 squad and recently was called up to participate in a training camp for future France under-21 players. On 25 May 2009, he was selected to the under-20 squad to participate in the 2009 Mediterranean Games.

In 2012, the French coach of Mauritania, Patrice Neveu, said he had reached an agreement with Guidileye to represent the senior national team from his country of origin in the future.

Goals
Scores and results list Mauritania's goal tally first.

References

External links
 LFP Profile
 
 Profile on Troyes AC Website
 NFT Profile

1989 births
Living people
French sportspeople of Mauritanian descent
People from Gorgol Region
Association football midfielders
Mauritanian footballers
Mauritania international footballers
Mauritanian expatriate footballers
French footballers
France youth international footballers
Competitors at the 2009 Mediterranean Games
French expatriate footballers
ES Troyes AC players
Stade Brestois 29 players
LB Châteauroux players
AS Nancy Lorraine players
AEL Limassol players
Gençlerbirliği S.K. footballers
Shamakhi FK players
Elazığspor footballers
Ligue 2 players
Ligue 1 players
Cypriot First Division players
Süper Lig players
Azerbaijan Premier League players
TFF First League players
Expatriate footballers in Cyprus
2019 Africa Cup of Nations players
Mediterranean Games competitors for France
Mauritanian expatriate sportspeople in Cyprus
Mauritanian expatriate sportspeople in Turkey
Mauritanian expatriate sportspeople in Azerbaijan
Expatriate footballers in Azerbaijan
Expatriate footballers in Turkey
Mauritanian expatriate sportspeople in Morocco
Expatriate footballers in Morocco